On April 16, 1816, Richard Stanford (DR) of  died in office.  A special election was held to fill the resulting vacancy

Election results

Dickens took his seat December 2, 1816, at the start of the Second Session of the 14th Congress.

See also
 List of special elections to the United States House of Representatives
 1816 and 1817 United States House of Representatives elections
 List of United States representatives from North Carolina

References

1816 08
North Carolina 1816 08
North Carolina 08
North Carolina 08
United States House of Representatives 08
United States House of Representatives 1816 08